The eighth series of Ex on the Beach, a British television programme is expected to begin on 20 March 2018. The series was confirmed in August 2017. The cast members for this series were confirmed on 20 February 2018, and includes Geordie Shore star Marnie Simpson as well as The X Factor contestant, and Stereo Kicks and Union J singer Casey Johnson.

Cast
The official list of cast members was released on 20 February 2018. They include four boys; Marcel Stevens, Sam Lonsdale, Tom Litten and Zach Tull, and four girls: Charlotte Hughes, Katie Champ, Marnie Simpson and Sofia Filipe. Marnie has previously appeared as a cast member on Geordie Shore. With the announcement of the line-up it was also confirmed that Marnie's ex-boyfriend and former Stereo Kicks and Union J singer Casey Johnson would be arriving on the beach as an ex, as well as Kyle Walker. They had all previously appeared together on MTV's Single AF. Former Ibiza Weekender cast member Laura Louise will also feature as an ex.

All original cast members arrived at the beach during the first episode and were immediately told to prepare for the arrival of their exes. However in a further twist, Kurtis Hartman turned up at the villa to join the cast. Lorna Boswell became the first ex to turn up on the beach desperate for revenge on her ex-boyfriend Tom. Sofia was delivered a double blow during the second episode when two of her exes, Joe Angus and Mikey Speakman both arrived on the beach. The Tablet of Terror later revealed that both were on borrowed time with Sofia having the ultimate decision of which one to send home. She chose Mikey. Becky Taylor, the ex-girlfriend of Zach also arrived during this episode. The third episode featured the arrival of Union J singer Casey Johnson, who turned up as the ex-boyfriend of Marnie. Another of her exes, Kyle Walker turned up on the beach during the fourth episode, as well as Lorna's ex-fling Bibi Machin. Marnie was also given the tough decision to send somebody home. She chose Sam. The next human wrecking ball to arrive at the beach was former Ibiza Weekender cast member Laura Louise, who is the ex-girlfriend of Marcel. She turned up during the fifth episode, as well as Gino Antonio, the ex-boyfriend of Charlotte. Tom was also sent packing during this episode after Bibi was given the power to send somebody home. Kurtis was the next cast member to leave the villa, this time during the sixth episode. This episode also featured the arrival of Marcel's second ex-girlfriend Bea Tetteh. The pair later decided to voluntarily leave the villa after reconciling.  Becky's ex-boyfriend Aaron McLeod made his arrival during the seventh episode, which also featured Bibi deciding to pack her bags after one too many rejections. The eighth episode featured the arrival of the final ex, Emily Wise, who turned up hoping to get closure from her ex-boyfriend Kyle.

Bold indicates original cast member; all other cast were brought into the series as an ex.

Duration of cast

Table Key
 Key:  = "Cast member" is featured in this episode
 Key:  = "Cast member" arrives on the beach
 Key:  = "Cast member" has an ex arrive on the beach
 Key:  = "Cast member" has two exes arrive on the beach
 Key:  = "Cast member" arrives on the beach and has an ex arrive during the same episode
 Key:  = "Cast member" leaves the beach
 Key:  = "Cast member" has an ex arrive on the beach and leaves during the same episode
 Key:  = "Cast member" arrives on the beach and leaves during the same episode
 Key:  = "Cast member" does not feature in this episode

Episodes

{| class="wikitable plainrowheaders" style="width:100%"
|- style="color:black"
! style="background:#2E2EFE;"| No. inseries
! style="background:#2E2EFE;"| No. inseason
! style="background:#2E2EFE;"| Title
! style="background:#2E2EFE;"| Original air date
! style="background:#2E2EFE;"| Duration
! style="background:#2E2EFE;"| UK viewers

|}

Ratings

References

External links
Official website

2018 British television seasons
08